The enzyme tropinesterase (EC 3.1.1.10) catalyzes the reaction

atropine + H2O  tropine + tropate

This enzyme belongs to the family of hydrolases, specifically those acting on carboxylic ester bonds.  The systematic name is atropine acylhydrolase. Other names in common use include tropine esterase, atropinase, and atropine esterase.

References

 
 

EC 3.1.1
Enzymes of unknown structure